The Duomatic principle is a principle of English company law relating to the informal approval of actions by a company's shareholders (and, potentially, directors).  The principle is named after one of the earlier judicial decisions in which it was recognised: Re Duomatic Ltd [1969] 2 Ch 365, although in that case Buckley J was approving an older statement of the law from the decisions in In re Express Engineering [1920] 1 Ch 466 and Parker and Cooper Ltd v Reading [1926] Ch 975.  It origins lie in the obiter dictum comments of Lord Davey in Salomon v Salomon & Co Ltd where he stated that 'the company is bound in a matter intra vires by the unanimous agreement of its members'.

The principle will apply even if the articles of association specifies a particular procedure in relation to the subject matter of the decision.

It has been noted that although the principle is normally referred to as the Duomatic principle, the actual rule predates that case by several decades.

Re Duomatic

The decision in Re Duomatic concerned whether certain payments made to directors of a company were valid even though none of the directors had contracts of service with the company, and no resolution had ever been passed authorising them to receive the payments.  The company went into liquidation and the liquidator made an application for repayment of the money.  The court held that the payments were to be regarded as properly authorised because they had been made with the full knowledge and consent of all the shareholders.  Buckley J explained:

The broad principle has never been seriously questioned by the courts since.  In  Neuberger J stated:

Requirements

The application of the Duomatic principle contains two core requirements:
 The consent of shareholders must be unanimous.
 The shareholders must consent with full knowledge of what it is they are consenting to.

Furthermore, subsequent cases indicate that there must be some outward manifestation of the consent, either in the form of a document, a statement or by conduct.  A mere "internal decision" on the part of the shareholders is not sufficient by itself.  In  Newey J stated:

Expansion

In subsequent cases courts have expanded the general principle to also apply to a wider array of situations.
 In  it was affirmed that the principle applied to the ostensible authority of persons as well as to express authority.
 In  it was held that the consent of  the beneficial owner of any shares would be sufficient if the trustee can be compelled to vote in accordance with the beneficial owner's wishes.  But in  it was clarified that where shares were held for more than one beneficial owner as joint owners, the assent of only one of the joint owners would not be sufficient.
 In Runciman v Walter Runciman plc [1992] BCLC 1084 at 1092 and  it was held that informal and unanimous consent of the board of directors is also effective as a resolution passed at a duly convened meeting.  Prior to those cases there was doubt as to whether the principle would apply to directors because of their fiduciary duties to the company might preclude informal assent.
 The principle has also been extended beyond company law to include committees of clubs which are unincorporated associations, see .

Footnotes

United Kingdom company law